4.3.2.1. (which stands for "4 girls, 3 days, 2 cities, 1 chance") is a 2010 British crime thriller film directed by Noel Clarke and Mark Davis, written by Clarke and starring Emma Roberts, Tamsin Egerton, Ophelia Lovibond, Shanika-Warren Markland, Mandy Patinkin, Helen McCrory, Kevin Smith, Susannah Fielding, Camille Coduri and Clarke. 4.3.2.1. follows four feisty girls who get caught up with a diamond theft heist. 

Clarke wrote 4.3.2.1. with the intention of making a more mainstream film in regards to his previous work, Kidulthood Adulthood and West 10 LDN, which were gritty crime drama films set in West London. 4.3.2.1 was released in the United Kingdom on 2 June 2010. The film received mixed to negative reviews and was a box office bomb.

Plot 
Four 19-year-old friends: Joanne, Cassandra, Shannon, and Kelly, all meet one other at a diner, where they see Dillon and Smoothy. As the police turn up, Dillon and Smoothy run off and Dillon accidentally drops a stolen diamond into Cassandra's bag. The four girls then walk out and go their separate ways home.

Shannon returns home just as her mother is leaving her father. Jo calls Shannon over to the 24-hour supermarket where she works with Angelo, but tells her to leave as soon as she arrives. When she refuses, Dillon kisses Jo, upsetting Shannon, so she grabs a Pringles tube from the shop and runs away. After getting drunk at a bar, Shannon is attacked by a gang and then rescued by Kelly. Shannon finds out that Kelly is searching for "15 diamonds". One is already in Cassandra's bag, and the rest are in the tube that fell out of Shannon's bag when she was attacked. Shannon escapes and retrieves the tube, then leaves a message informing Jo about the diamonds. Later, Shannon tracks down her mother and accuses her of not caring about her, especially when she forced her to get an abortion. Shannon soon holds the diamonds above a bridge, contemplating suicide.

Meanwhile, Cassandra visits New York City to meet up with Brett, whom she has met on the internet, and audition for a piano school. She has sex with Brett and in the morning finds all her possessions gone, except for her handbag, which contains a diamond. She also finds a letter written by Shannon's mother explaining why she left. She mails it to Kerrys' house to deliver it to Shannon. She goes to Brett's house to find that Brett is a stalker who hacked into Cassandra's computer, taking videos of her. When the fake Brett comes, she knocks him out and erases the footage and proceeds to take photos of his genitals as revenge. Cassandra forces her way into an impromptu audition with Jago Larofsky and wins a place at his school. She then leaves to go home to London, telling Jo she knows where Shannon is.

After witnessing her brother Manuel receive a package with instructions from Dillon and Smoothy, Kerrys and her girlfriend Jas break into Cassandra's home and stay there for the weekend. Manuel arrives there and they discover a panic room. Manuel locks them in the panic room, returns the package to Dillon and Smoothy as instructed and throws a party. When the two girls escape from the panic room, they angrily force everyone out of the flat. Kerrys goes home and finds Shannon's mother's letter that Cassandra had sent her. After making amends with her father, she locks Manuel in the trunk of his new car and drives off to find Shannon, but when he tries to attack her, she crashes the car into Jo's shop.

Jo begins to become suspicious of her new manager, Tee, who has been working with Dillon and Smoothy to deliver the diamonds, but one is missing. Dillon and Smoothy come to get the money, but find that Tee has betrayed them, keeping the money for himself, and they hold up the store in retaliation. When Shannon arrives, Jo tries to make her leave and Dillon kisses Jo, whom unseen to Shannon, is at gunpoint. Shannon leaves, stealing the tube of Pringles, which unbeknownst to her contains the 14 diamonds Tee had hidden inside. The next day, Jo realizes that Shannon has the diamonds, and when Tee is about to be shot by Kelly, Jo rescues him before Kerrys crashes Manuel's car into the shop. Jo helps Kerrys escape and leaves a note and a DVD implicating Tee, but when he tries to run, Angelo attacks him and Tee is then arrested by the police.

Cassandra returns with the last diamond. She meets Jo and Kerrys and they go to find Shannon. They talk her down and give her the letter, comforting her. They put the 15 diamonds together, give them to the police and fly to New York City with Kelly also on the plane.

Cast 

 Emma Roberts as Joanne
 Tamsin Egerton as Cassandra
 Ophelia Lovibond as Shannon
 Shanika Warren-Markland as Kelly
 Adam Deacon as Dillon
 Susannah Fielding as Jas
 Jacob Anderson as Angelo
 Freddie Stroma as Cool Brett
 Adam Gillen as Geek Brett
 Linzey Cocker as Gwen
 Plan B as Terry
 Ashley Thomas as Smoothy
 Alan McKenna as Mr. Jones
 Camille Coduri as Mrs. Phillips

 Sean Pertwee as Mr. Richards
 Davie Fairbanks as Fraser
 Nicholas Briggs as Barry
 Kate Magowan as Mrs. Richards
 Helen McCrory as Mrs. Jones
 Ben Miller as Mr. Philips
 Alexander Siddig as Robert
 Michelle Ryan as Kelly
 Eve as Latisha
 Mandy Patinkin as Jago Larofsky
 Kevin Smith as Big Larry
 Noel Clarke as Tee
 Andrew Harwood Mills as Phil
 Gregg Chillin as Manuel

Critical reception 
The film has received largely negative reviews from critics, most critiquing the screenplay, shaky cinematography, and horrible main characters.

Peter Bradshaw from British newspaper The Guardian and Wendy Ide from The Times both gave the film a negative review. Bradshaw said the film is "all over the place", also deeming that the acting is on the "torpid side", and Ide believed the film "might just claim back a small corner of the multiplex audience from the relentless onslaught of cynical Hollywood garbage" and described the film as "mostly" bad.

Soundtrack 

The soundtrack was released on 28 May 2010 by Sony Music Entertainment.

 "Keep Moving"- Adam Deacon & Bashy featuring Paloma Faith
 "No Bullshit" – Bodyrox
 "When I'm Alone" – Lissie
 "Ya Get Me" (Movie Snippet) – Adam Deacon
 "On This Ting" – Adam Deacon
 "A Different Light" – Kerry Leatham
 "Bend Over" (Movie Snippet) – Kevin Smith & Tamsin Egerton
 "Better Days" (Revox) – Speech Debelle featuring Micachu, Wiley and Incredubwoy
 "I Wanna Party" – Mz Bratt
 "Don't Look Back" – The Union Exchange
 "Go Home" – Eliza Doolittle
 "Do You Fancy Me?" (Bluff) – Kerry Leatham
 "No Significance" – Davinche featuring Henriette Bond
 "Drunk Girls" – Stefan Abingdon
 "Paradox" – WKB featuring Myles Sanko
 "Dance Flor" – Davinche
 "This Year" – Mz Bratt featuring Griminal
 "Forever" – Ashley Walters
 "She's a Gangsta" – Bashy featuring Zalon
 "You Took My Shopping" (Movie Snippet) – Tamsin Egerton
 "Typical Actor" – Adam Deacon
 "Pretty Young Things" – Bodyrox
 "My Size Kid" – Adam Deacon
 "Strangely Sexy Though" (Movie Snippet) – Emma Roberts

References

External links 
 

2010 films
2010 crime thriller films
2010s heist films
British crime thriller films
British heist films
2010s English-language films
Films directed by Noel Clarke
Films shot at Pinewood Studios
Universal Pictures films
Hyperlink films
Films with screenplays by Noel Clarke
2010s British films